Aurel Vlaicu is a metro station in the north of Bucharest, named after the Romanian aeroplane constructor and pioneer aviator, Aurel Vlaicu. It lies on the western end of the Pipera industrial platform, close to an intersection of three boulevards.

The station was opened on 24 October 1987 as part of the extension from Piața Unirii to Pipera.
There are plans to add a permanent exhibition to the platform, in hommage to the life of Romanian aviation pioneer Aurel Vlaicu.

References

Bucharest Metro stations
Railway stations opened in 1987
1987 establishments in Romania